III liga, group IV is one of the four groups of III liga, which are competitions of the fourth tier of the Polish football league system.

This group was established in 2016, when, after the 2015–16 season, as a result of the reorganization of the III liga in Poland, group VII was merged with group VIII.

Responsible for the games taking place in this group are: the Lublin Football Association based in Lublin, the Lesser Poland Football Association based in Kraków, the Subcarpathian Football Association based in Rzeszów and the Holy Cross Football Association based in Kielce. The group consists of 18 teams from the following voivodeships: Lublin, Lesser Poland, Subcarpathian and Holy Cross.

In the 2020–21 season, due to the COVID-19 pandemic unexpected complications (no relegation to IV liga and one relegated team from II liga after the 2019–20 season), the group was temporarily expanded to 21 teams.

Top teams season-by-season

Top scorers season-by-season

2020–21 season

2019–20 season

Notes

References

 
4
Pol
Professional sports leagues in Poland